Josef Anton Schobinger (30 January 1849, in Lucerne – 27 November 1911) was a Swiss politician and member of the Swiss Federal Council (1908–1911).

He was elected to the Federal Council of Switzerland on 17 June 1908, and died in office on 27 November 1911. He was affiliated with the Christian Democratic People's Party of Switzerland. 

While in office he held positions in the following departments:
Department of Justice and Police (1908)
Department of Trade, Industry and Agriculture (1909)
Department of Finance (1910)
Department of Home Affairs (1911)

References

External links

1849 births
1911 deaths
People from Lucerne
Swiss Roman Catholics
Christian Democratic People's Party of Switzerland politicians
Members of the Federal Council (Switzerland)
Finance ministers of Switzerland
Members of the National Council (Switzerland)
Presidents of the National Council (Switzerland)
ETH Zurich alumni